EA Vancouver (formerly known as EA Burnaby, then EA Canada) is a Canadian video game developer located in Burnaby, British Columbia. The development studio opened as Distinctive Software in January 1983, and is also Electronic Arts's largest and oldest studio. EA Vancouver employs approximately 1,300 people, and houses the world's largest video game test operation.

Premises
The campus consists of a motion-capture studio, twenty-two rooms for composing, fourteen video editing suites, three production studios, a wing for audio compositions, and a quality assurance department. There are also facilities such as fitness rooms, two theatres, a cafeteria, coffee bars, a soccer field, and several arcades. The building is situated next to Discovery Park.

History
EA Vancouver is a major studio of the American gaming software giant Electronic Arts (EA) which has many studios around the globe. EA, based in Redwood City, California, had acquired Distinctive Software in 1991 for $11 million and renamed Distinctive Software to EA Canada. At the time of the business acquisition, Distinctive Software was noted for developing a number of racing and sporting games published under the Accolade brand. Since becoming EA Canada, EA Canada has developed many EA Games, EA Sports, and EA Sports BIG games.

EA acquired Black Box Games in 2002 and Black Box Games became part of EA Canada under the name of EA Black Box. EA Black Box later became an independent EA studio in 2005. Since its acquisition, EA Black Box became home of the Need for Speed franchise, and many others.

In 2011, EA Canada acquired Bight Games, a maker of freemium games.

Games developed

EA Sports
Games developed for publishing by EA Sports:
3 on 3 NHL Arcade
2002 FIFA World Cup
2006 FIFA World Cup
2010 FIFA World Cup South Africa
2014 FIFA World Cup Brazil
EA Sports UFC
EA Sports UFC 2
EA Sports UFC 3
EA Sports UFC 4
FIFA 97
FIFA: Road to World Cup 98
FIFA 99
FIFA 2000
FIFA 2001
FIFA Football 2002
FIFA Football 2003
FIFA Football 2004
FIFA Football 2005
FIFA 06
FIFA 07
FIFA 08
FIFA 09
FIFA 10
FIFA 11
FIFA 12
FIFA 13
FIFA 14
FIFA 15
FIFA 16
FIFA 17
FIFA 18
FIFA 19
FIFA 20
FIFA 21
FIFA 22
FIFA Street (2012)
FIFA Manager 06
FIFA Online
FaceBreaker
Fight Night Round 4
Fight Night Champion
Grand Slam Tennis
Celebrity Sports Showdown
Cricket 07
John Madden Football '93 (Super NES)
Knockout Kings
Madden NFL 07 (Wii)
MVP 06 NCAA Baseball
NBA Live 2003
NBA Live 2004
NBA Live 2005
NBA Live 06
NBA Live 07
NBA Live 08
NBA Live 09
NBA Live 10
NCAA March Madness 2002
NCAA March Madness 2005
NCAA March Madness 06
NCAA March Madness 07
NCAA March Madness 08
NCAA Basketball 09
NCAA Basketball 10
NHL '94
NHL 97
NHL 98
NHL 99
NHL 2000
NHL 2001
NHL 2002
NHL 06
NHL 07
NHL 08
NHL 09
NHL 10
NHL 11
NHL 12
NHL 13
NHL 14
NHL 15
NHL 16
NHL 17
NHL 18
NHL 19
NHL 20
NHL 21
NHL 22
Rugby 2005
Rugby 06
SSX (2012)
Total Club Manager 2005
Triple Play 96
Triple Play 2000
UEFA Champions League 2006–2007
UEFA Euro 2004
UEFA Euro 2008
UEFA Euro 2012
World Cup 98

EA Sports BIG
Games developed for publishing by EA Sports BIG:
Def Jam Vendetta
FaceBreaker
FIFA Street (2005)
FIFA Street 2
FIFA Street 3
NBA Street
NBA Street Vol. 2
NBA Street V3
NFL Street
NFL Street 2
NFL Street 3
NFL Tour
Sled Storm
SSX (2000)
SSX Tricky
SSX 3
SSX On Tour
SSX Blur

EA Graphics Library
EA Graphics Library or EAGL is a game engine which was created and developed by EA Canada. It is the main engine used in some of EA's games, notably the Need for Speed series, and was also used in a few sports titles from EA Sports.

Need for Speed: Hot Pursuit 2 and Need for Speed: Underground used the first version of the EAGL engine, (EAGL 1) Need for Speed: Underground 2 uses EAGL 2, Need for Speed: Most Wanted and Need for Speed: Carbon uses EAGL 3, Need for Speed: ProStreet and Need for Speed Undercover uses EAGL 4; Need for Speed Undercover uses a modified version of EAGL 4 and combines it with the Heroic Driving Engine.

Need for Speed: World uses a modified EAGL 3 engine with the physics of the earlier games with an external GUI programmed in Adobe Flash.

During the development for Need for Speed: The Run, EA Black Box dropped its custom engine and adopted Frostbite 2 engine.

References

External links
 
 

1983 establishments in British Columbia
Electronic Arts
Video game companies of Canada
Companies based in Burnaby
Video game development companies
Canadian companies established in 1983
Video game companies established in 1983
Canadian subsidiaries of foreign companies